Joan Manuel Sánchez Caballero (born 26 September 1992) is a Spanish professional footballer who plays for CD Segorbe. Mainly a central defender, he can also play as a left back.

Club career
Born in Valencia, Sánchez made his debuts as a senior with Tavernes Blanques CF, in the regional leagues. In the 2011 summer he moved to UD Juventud Barrio del Cristo in Tercera División and appeared regularly for the side during the campaign, suffering relegation.

On 30 January 2013, after a stint at CD Llosa, Sánchez signed for Segunda División B side Yeclano Deportivo. On 18 July, after another drop, he joined CD Acero in the fourth tier.

On 29 January 2014 Sánchez moved abroad for the first time in his career, signing for Slovak 2. Liga club MFK Zemplín Michalovce. After winning promotion to Slovak Super Liga in the 2014–15 campaign, he made his professional debut on 8 August 2015, starting in a 2–1 home win against FC ViOn Zlaté Moravce.

In the summer 2019, Sánchez moved to SC Requena.

Honours
2. Liga: 2014–15

References

External links
Zemplín Michalovce official profile 
Eurofotbal profile

1992 births
Living people
Footballers from Valencia (city)
Spanish footballers
Association football defenders
Segunda División B players
Tercera División players
Slovak Super Liga players
Levante UD footballers
MFK Zemplín Michalovce players
CD Calahorra players
Spanish expatriate footballers
Spanish expatriate sportspeople in Slovakia
Expatriate footballers in Slovakia
Yeclano Deportivo players